István Vaskuti (born December 4, 1955 in Debrecen) is a Hungarian sprint canoeist who competed from the late 1970s to the late 1980s. Competing in two Summer Olympics, he won the C-2 500 m event in Moscow in 1980.

Vaskuti also won seven medals at the ICF Canoe Sprint World Championships with six golds (C-2 500 m: 1977, 1978, 1981, 1985, 1986; C-2 1000 m: 1986) and one bronze (C-2 500 m: 1982).
After his career as active competitor, he started to work as a canoe-coach and succeeded also on this side of the sport and won several world and Olympic titles as coach of different famous canoeists.

He is now a sports administrator, chairman of the International Canoe Federation Flatwater Committee. He was Chief Official at the 2006 World Championships, held in the Hungarian city of Szeged. In 2008, Vaskúti was elected First Vice President of the ICF at their Congress in Rome.

References
ICF 2008 ICF Congress report in Rome, including Vaskuti's appointment. - accessed November 30, 2008.

1955 births
Canoeists at the 1980 Summer Olympics
Canoeists at the 1988 Summer Olympics
Hungarian male canoeists
Living people
Olympic canoeists of Hungary
Olympic gold medalists for Hungary
Hungarian referees and umpires
Olympic medalists in canoeing
ICF Canoe Sprint World Championships medalists in Canadian
Medalists at the 1980 Summer Olympics
20th-century Hungarian people